John Orrell (December 31, 1934 – September 16, 2003) was a British author, theatre historian, and English professor at the University of Alberta. The New York Times described him as the "historian whose intellectual detective work laid the groundwork for the 1997 re-creation of Shakespeare’s original Globe Theater."

Life and work
Orrell was born in Kent, England. After completing his National Service as a pilot at the NATO base in Moose Jaw, Saskatchewan, he obtained a degree in English at University College, Oxford, followed by a Ph.D. at the University of Toronto. In 1961 he joined the English department at the University of Alberta in Edmonton, where he lived for the rest of his life.

Orrell wrote and presented documentaries for CBC Television on a wide range of subjects, from Louis Riel to avalanche control to the Renaissance and Elizabethan culture. His book The Quest for Shakespeare’s Globe, published by Cambridge University Press in 1983, brought him international recognition, and led to him serving as advisor to the architect for Sam Wanamaker’s reconstruction of Shakespeare's Globe theatre in Southwark, London. He also wrote several other books on theatre history, including Fallen Empires: Lost Theatres of Edmonton 1881-1914 (1981) which was reissued in 2007.

John Orrell died in Edmonton on September 16, 2003 from skin cancer. In June 2004, he was posthumously given the Sam Wanamaker Award at the Globe in London. In October 2004, during Edmonton’s centennial celebration, he was named one of the 100 Edmontonians of the century.

His son is the mathematician and author David Orrell.

Books by John Orrell
Fallen Empires: Lost Theatres of Edmonton 1881–1914 (1981)
The Quest for Shakespeare’s Globe (1983)
The Theatres of Inigo Jones and John Webb (1985)
The Human Stage: English Theatre Design 1567–1840 (1988)
Rebuilding Shakespeare’s Globe (1989), written with Andrew Gurr

Awards
 2004 Sam Wanamaker Prize
 100 Edmontonians of the Century

References

External links
 Canadian Literature’s review of Fallen Empires
 Obituary in New York Times
 Obituary in the Independent

1934 births
2003 deaths
English emigrants to Canada
Fellows of the Royal Society of Canada
Academic staff of the University of Alberta
People educated at Maidstone Grammar School